Indonesia and South Korea established diplomatic relations (Indonesian: Hubungan Indonesia–Korea Selatan) in 1973. Both countries share a common vision, values and the will to contribute to the international community as middle powers. Both countries are members of G-20 and APEC. South Korea has an embassy in Jakarta and Indonesia has an embassy in Seoul. According to a 2014 BBC World Service Poll, 48% of Indonesians view South Korea's influence positively, with 27% expressing a negative view. The Chinese Indonesian merchant Chen Yanxiang visited Korea between the 1390s and the 1410s, the first major contact between the two nations.

Military Cooperation
Fast growing trade and investment enabled the two governments to agree on a strategic partnership in 2006. Indonesia and South Korea have invested in multiple joint military development projects, including the KFX/IFX fighter jet. South Korean firm Daewoo Shipbuilding and Marine Engineering (DSME) is in final contract negotiations to supply Indonesia with three Type-209 submarines. This will be the largest ever bilateral defense deal, valued at US$1.1 billion.

Residents
In 2012, there were about 38,000 Indonesian citizens living in South Korea.

Economy and trade

In the past, the relations were only developed around trade and investments, such as the forestry and garment sectors. Today the cooperation has been expanded to a number of mega projects and advanced industries. With US$27 billion in bilateral trade, South Korea became the fourth biggest trading partner of Indonesia in 2012. It became the third-biggest foreign investor in Indonesia, with US$1.94 billion in investment.

There are large numbers of South Korean companies that have been investing and operating in Indonesia, such as Miwon (Daesang Corporation), Lotte, Yong Ma, Hankook Tire, Samsung, LG, Kia Motors, and Hyundai. In 2011, Hankook announced a US$353 million investment into a production plant located in Bekasi, West Java, Indonesia.

In 2019, trade between Indonesia and South Korea was worth $15.65 billion, and between 2015 and 2019 South Korean companies invested nearly $7 billion in Indonesia. In December 2020, Indonesia and South Korea signed a comprehensive economic partnership. It is equivalent to a free trade agreement, though focuses on a broader scope of economic cooperation. Under the deal, Indonesia will scrap 94.8% of tariffs on South Korean products while South Korea will scrap 95.8% of tariffs on Indonesian products.

Culture
Popular South Korean culture are well known in Indonesia, which include Korean dramas and K-pop. 

Numerous K-pop performances, such as SMTown Live World Tour III and Music Bank World Tour, have  been performed in Indonesia.

State visits
President Chun Doo Hwan visited Indonesia in July 1981, and in the next year President Soeharto visited South Korea in October 1982. In November 1988 President Roh Tae Woo visited Indonesia. President Kim Young Sam visited Indonesia in November 1994. Indonesian President Abdurrahman Wahid visited South Korea twice in 2000, on February and on October, and in the same year, President Kim Dae Jung visited Indonesia in November. President Megawati Soekarnoputri visited South Korea in March 2002.

President Susilo Bambang Yudhoyono visited South Korea during an APEC Summit in November 2005. In December 2006, President Roh Moo Hyun visited Indonesia to sign a Joint Strategic Partnership between Indonesia and South Korea. President Yudhoyono visited Korea as a state guest in March 2012 and President Lee Myung-bak visited Bali to attend the Bali Democracy Forum in November 2012.

Country comparison

See also 
Koreans in Indonesia
Indonesians in South Korea

Notes

External links
The Embassy of Republic of Indonesia in Seoul, South Korea
The Embassy of Republic of Korea in Jakarta, Indonesia 

 
South Korea
Bilateral relations of South Korea